The 1988–89 South Carolina Gamecocks men's basketball team represented the University of South Carolina as a member of the Metro Conference during the 1988–89 men's college basketball season. The team was led by head coach George Felton and played their home games at Carolina Coliseum in Columbia, South Carolina. The team received an at-large bid to the 1989 NCAA tournament as No. 12 seed in the East region – the team's first appearance in the tournament in 15 years. The Gamecocks lost to NC State in the first round to finish the season with a record of 19–11 (8–4 Metro).

Roster

Schedule and results

|-
!colspan=9 style= | Regular Season

|-
!colspan=9 style= | Metro Conference Tournament

|-
!colspan=9 style= | NCAA Tournament

Rankings

References

South Carolina Gamecocks men's basketball seasons
South Carol
South Carol
South Car
South Car